The 18th Secretariat of the Communist Party of the Soviet Union was elected by the 18th Central Committee in the aftermath of the 18th Congress, held in 1939.

List of members

Secretariat of the Central Committee of the Communist Party of the Soviet Union members
1939 establishments in the Soviet Union
1952 disestablishments in the Soviet Union